Ashley railway station is in the village of Ashley in Cheshire, England.

History
The station was opened by the Cheshire Midland Railway (CMR) on 12 May 1862 when the railway opened from Altrincham to Knutsford. The CMR was amalgamated into the Cheshire Lines Committee (CLC) on 15 August 1867. The station was served by passenger trains from Manchester Central to Northwich and Chester Northgate. The CLC remained an independent entity, as a joint London, Midland and Scottish Railway and London and North Eastern Railway operation after the Grouping of 1923, until the creation of British Railways (BR). The station then passed on to the London Midland Region of British Railways on nationalisation on 1 January 1948. When Sectorisation was introduced in the 1980s, the station was served by Regional Railways under arrangement with the Greater Manchester PTE until the Privatisation of British Railways.

The station retains many of its original features and buildings, although these have been converted for residential use.

Facilities
The station is unstaffed and was, until 12 December 2010, a request stop only.  Amenities here are very basic, with just a single waiting shelter on platform 2 and bench seating, timetable posters and a public telephone.  Step-free access is available to both platforms. A ticket vending machine is in place for the purchase of tickets or promise to pay coupons and for the collection of pre-paid tickets.

Services
There is an hourly service (more at peak times) on weekdays and Saturdays running to Manchester via Stockport and in the opposite direction to Chester. Trains call every two hours on Sundays, although, since 2018, no longer with through running beyond Manchester Piccadilly to  via Bolton and Wigan Wallgate.

References

 
 
 Station on navigable 1946 O. S. map

Further reading

External links

  Mid-Cheshire Community Rail Partnership

Railway stations in Cheshire
DfT Category F2 stations
Former Cheshire Lines Committee stations
Northern franchise railway stations
Railway stations in Great Britain opened in 1862